The 2014–15 season was the 113th season of competitive association football in Spain.

Promotion and relegation

Pre-season

National teams

Spain national football team

UEFA Euro 2016 qualifying

Results and fixtures

Spain women's national football team

2015 FIFA Women's World Cup qualification (UEFA) Group 2

2015 FIFA Women's World Cup Group E

Results and fixtures

FIFA competitions

2014 FIFA Club World Cup

Semifinals

Final

UEFA competitions

2014–15 UEFA Champions League

Play-off round

|}

Group stage

Group A

Group B

Group F

Group H

Knockout phase

Round of 16

|}

Quarter-finals

|}

Semi-finals

|}

Final

2014–15 UEFA Europa League

Third qualifying round

|}

Play-off round

|}

Group stage

Group A

Group G

Knockout phase

Round of 32

Round of 16

Quarter-finals

Semi-finals

Final

2014–15 UEFA Youth League

Group A

Group B

Group F

Group H

Round of 16

Quarter-finals

2014 UEFA Super Cup

2014–15 UEFA Women's Champions League

Knockout phase

Round of 32

|}

Round of 16

|}

Men's football

League season

La Liga

League table

Segunda División

League table

Promotion play-offs

Semifinals

|}

Final

|}

Segunda División B

Group champions' play-offs

Semifinals

|}

Final

|}

Non-champions promotion play-off

First round 

|}

Second round 

|}

Third round 

|}

Cup competitions

Copa del Rey

Final

Supercopa de España

First leg

Second leg 

Atlético Madrid won the Supercopa de España 2–1 on aggregate

Copa Federación de España

Women's football

League season

Primera División

Segunda División

Group 1

Group 2

Group 3

Group 4

Group 5

Group 6

Group 6.1

Group 6.2

Bracket

Group 7

Promotion playoffs

Bracket

Cup competitions

Copa de la Reina

References

External links
La Liga
Royal Spanish Football Federation

 
Football
Football
Spain
Spain